Olney ( or ) is a neighborhood in North Philadelphia, Pennsylvania, United States. It is roughly bounded by Roosevelt Boulevard to the south, Tacony Creek to the east, Godfrey Avenue to the north, and the railroad right-of-way west of Seventh Street to the west.

Although Olney is primarily a quiet residential neighborhood, portions do serve as major commercial centers for many surrounding groups. 5th Street has a Korean-American business district in the vicinity of Olney Avenue, and Hispanic businesses flourish in the southern reaches of the neighborhood.

Fisher Park is located in Olney. It is a  public park which was laid out and owned by Joseph Wharton, founder of Swarthmore College and the Wharton School at the University of Pennsylvania. It was donated to the city by Joseph in 1908 as a "Christmas gift" to Philadelphia. Fisher Park has a football field, basketball and tennis courts, and a wooded hiking area.

Olney is named after the estate of Alexander Wilson (not the ornithologist), who resided on Rising Sun Avenue, near Tacony Creek.  Wilson chose the name for his residence because of his love for the poet William Cowper, of Olney, England. The mansion was demolished in 1924, but the name was applied to the growing village nearby.

History 
Up until the late nineteenth century, Olney was a vast, hilly farmland in the hinterland of Philadelphia County. Until then, the population consisted mainly of farmers and wealthy Philadelphians who could afford to live away from the city.

As the city of Philadelphia grew northwards, the area became more urbanized. People seeking to escape the growing population density towards the center moved to Olney. Soon thereafter, businesses began appearing, largely centered at 5th Street and Olney Avenue. Industry was also attracted and companies such as Heintz Manufacturing Company, Proctor and Schwartz, and Brown Instrument Division built factories in the neighborhood. But this took second place to the strong commercial district, led by the Olney Businessmans' Association.

The population grew even more after the construction of the Broad Street subway which had its original terminal at Olney Avenue (Olney Transportation Center). It promised to get riders from Olney to City Hall in less than twenty minutes for fifteen cents. In addition to trolley lines that traveled east and west, this made Olney Philadelphia's northern transportation hub and gave Olneyites easy access to the entire city and beyond.

In 1925, Colney Theatre was constructed which then had the largest one-floor seating capacity in the world with room for almost 2000 people. In 1931, Olney High School graduated its first class and for a time had the largest enrollment in the city with 3600 students. Olney High School's alumni include Philadelphia Phillies outfielder Del Ennis (1942), comedy writer Barry S. Waronker (1965), local news reporter Sheila Washington (1982), and former Feltonville historian Dennis Dalbey (1994). 

Olneyites lobbied the city intensely for the constructions of playgrounds and the library at 5th Street and Tabor Road. Community members put together an amateur Olney Symphony Orchestra (which continues to give concerts) and started their own newspaper, the Olney Times (which is no longer in circulation as of 2010).

Portuguese immigrants between the 1970's through the 1990's heavily impacted a section of North 5th street, primarily between Lindley Avenue and West Rockland Street. Affectionately known as Rua Cinco (5th Street), it was common to hear people speaking Portuguese on the street and in stores.  It was the area to find a Portuguese-speaking tailor, insurance agent,lawyer,travel agent or real estate agent. In 1987 the area boasted a Portuguese Businesses Association, five Portuguese travel agencies, three groceries (most notable, A Caravela and Girassol), two real estate offices, an insurance office, an electric-appliance store, a gift shop, a furniture store, several restaurants (Berlengas Island Restaurant, Cafe Portugal) bars, a bakery and cafes.  Not far from Rua Cinco was also the Philadelphia Portuguese Club (founded in 1935)that at the time had an estimated 700 members.   

Between the 1960s and 1980s, Olney began experiencing demographic change, as European-American residents moved out of the neighborhood in a process sometimes described as "white flight".  As part of the deindustrialization of Philadelphia, industry closed factories and moved from the area.  During this time there was an increase in crime in Olney.

The receding population was quickly supplemented by a new wave of residents, including African Americans from elsewhere in the city, and immigrants from Asia (Korea, mainly, as well as Vietnam, China, Cambodia and Laos) and Latin America (Puerto Rico, Colombia, Mexico, Cuba and Dominican Republic). This new population quickly filled the vacancies left behind in the commercial district. These groups created organizations such as the Korean Community Development Services Center.  

By the mid-1980s Koreans began moving out of Logan and into Olney and other communities. By 1986 up to 5,000 Koreans lived in Olney, and many Korean businesses were situated along North Fifth Street. Many Korean area residents referred to the area as "Koreatown."

The Olney station of the Broad Street subway, while no longer the terminal, is the second most used (next to City Hall). There are thriving business districts at 5th and Olney, Broad and Olney, and Front and Olney.

The Adams Avenue Bridge was listed on the National Register of Historic Places in 1988.

Education

Primary and secondary schools

Public schools
Olney, as with all areas in Philadelphia, is zoned to the School District of Philadelphia.

Olney has six public elementary schools:
 Lowell
 Finletter
 Morrison
 Grover Washington, Jr.
 Marshall
 Olney

Olney has two general zoned public high schools. Toward the southern reaches of the neighborhood Olney High School is the prime school. Samuel Fels High School is now accepting students living in the northern reaches of the neighborhood after violence in Olney High School became too prevalent. Central High School, the Philadelphia High School for Girls,  and The Widener Memorial School are located in Logan, a neighborhood that borders Olney.

Private schools
There are several private and parochial schools in Olney. Elementary schools include Saint Helena-Incarnation Regional Elementary School as of September 2012 merging Incarnation Catholic School & Saint Helena, and Olney Christian School which opened in September, 2012.  Area high schools include International Christian High School, which used to be Cedar Grove Christian Academy. Prior to its closing in 2010, Olney was the home of Cardinal Dougherty High School which was once the largest Roman Catholic high school in the United States.

Public libraries
The Free Library of Philadelphia operates the Greater Olney Branch.

Higher education
La Salle University borders Olney, Nicetown-Tioga and Germantown. Though the university is mostly considered within the borders of the Ogontz or Belfield neighborhoods, La Salle is sometimes erroneously labelled as in the Olney neighborhood, as its campus is located on 20th and Olney Avenue.

As a result, local media, students, or faculty will incorrectly refer to La Salle as in the Olney section of Philadelphia.

Demographics
Olney was originally settled by German Americans, and maintained an homogeneous population throughout the first half of the 20th century. Today, Olney is one of the most diverse middle class neighborhoods in Philadelphia, with the 2nd largest Mexican population only behind South Philadelphia. It is also home to large Colombians, Salvadorans, Guatemalans, Cambodians, African Americans, Koreans, Sub-Saharan Africans, West Indians, Hispanics, and Arab Americans communities as well as other smaller groups representing other nationalities and ethnic groups.

As of the census of 2010, the racial makeup of Olney was 49.5% African American, 26.3% Hispanic or Latino, 13.9% Asian, 6.9% White, and roughly 3% Multiracial. 

After growing modestly during the 1990s, the population of Olney decreased by 2.3% between 2000 and 2010 (from 37,366 to 36,474). Olney is located in the 19120 postal zip code, which it shares with Feltonville and Lawncrest. Its geographical coordinates are 40.034254 degrees North and 75.121256 degrees West.

In 2005, the median home sale price in the 19120 zip code was $79,950. This was an increase of 20% over the median price for 2004.

In popular culture
The majority of M. K. Asante's bestselling memoir Buck takes place in Olney.

See also

 Olney Transportation Center

References

The North 5th Street Revitalization Project
www.shopnorth5th.com

External links
 Broad and Olney in Philly.com
 Olney: Fifth St & Lindley Ave (Virtual Earth aerial perspective)
 Olney: Fifth St & Tabor Ave (Virtual Earth aerial perspective)
 Olney: odd-numbered side of 5500 N Fifth Street (Virtual Earth aerial perspective)
 Korean Community Development Services Center
 Historic Photographs of Olney, PhillyHistory.org

Neighborhoods in Philadelphia
Olney-Oak Lane, Philadelphia